Brazilians represent approximately 25% of the foreign population in Portugal. Their legal status varies according to several and complex elements such as date of arrival and effective legalization processes available to them (1992, 1996, 2001, 2003), whether they are married to a national or they have Portuguese (or other European) ancestors, what their level of education and work experience is, etc. Therefore, many are legal residents, others have authorization to stay (autorizações de permanência), others, fewer, were able to legalized through the 2003 exceptional process and have working permits, and many others are still undocumented.

Statistics 
Official numbers, according to Serviço de Estrangeiros e Fronteiras, indicated that in 2005 there were 31,353 Brazilians living as legal residents, and other 39,961 had authorizations to stay, making a total of 71,314 people. About 15,000 were able to legalize thanks to the bi-national accord of 2003 (which is still open), thus there are about 86,000 Brazilians living in Portugal who have solved their legal status.

Notable Portuguese people of Brazilian descent

 Bruno Alves – footballer
 Deco – footballer
 Liédson – footballer
 Tiago Monteiro – automobile racing driver
 Pepe – footballer
 Rony Lopes – footballer
 Quim Barreiros - singer

References

Portugal
Ethnic groups in Portugal
 
 
Immigration to Portugal